was a Japanese physician. During the Second World War, he disobeyed orders to conduct inhumane experiments on living human beings.

References

1913 births
1992 deaths
20th-century Japanese physicians
Civil disobedience